Snax (born 1969) is an American musician and DJ.

Snax may also refer to:
 Path Finder or SNAX, a Macintosh file browser 
 Assis Airport's ICAO code

See also
 Snacking (disambiguation)
 Snacks
 Snaxxx, a 2012 album by Mike Mictlan